Dimitar Vasiliev Zlatarev (Bulgarian: Димитър Василев Златарев; 5 August 1896 in Yambol, Principality of Bulgaria – 1937 in Komsomolsk-on-Amur, Soviet Union)  was a Bulgarian terrorist. He joined the Bulgarian Communist Party at 1919, rising to become a high-ranking member of its armaments section. At 1924 he and Dimitar Hadzhidimitrov suggested a plot to assassinate a police director and detonate a bomb at his funeral, thus killing many people in the police hierarchy. This attack is what later became the St Nedelya Church assault. Zlatarev fled to the USSR and was sentenced to death in absentia. During the Great Purge he was sent to a labor camp, where he died.

References

1937 deaths
1896 births
People from Yambol
Bulgarian communists
Bulgarian assassins
People sentenced to death in absentia
Bulgarian prisoners sentenced to death
Prisoners sentenced to death by Bulgaria
Great Purge victims
Bulgarian people imprisoned abroad
Bulgarian expatriates in the Soviet Union
Prisoners who died in Soviet detention
People granted political asylum in the Soviet Union
Executed communists